The 1st Guards Proletariat Moscow-Minsk Order of Lenin, twice Red Banner Orders of Suvorov (II) and Kutuzov (II) Motor Rifle Division was a division of the Red Army and Russian Ground Forces active from c. 1918 to 2002.

History

Interwar period

It was formed either in December 1924 or at the beginning of 1927 in the Moscow Military District, gaining the title of the "1st Moscow Proletariat Red Banner Rifle Division". Pavel Batov was a battalion and then regiment commander in the division in the late 1920s. In August 1939 it raised cadres for the 115th and 126th Rifle Divisions.

In the mid 1930s the 1st Division was also the first to use modern headgear and weapons for the rising Red Army.

World War II
It was re-raised from its single remaining regiment in September 1939 (second formation), and by January 1940 was re-formed as the 1st Moscow Motor Rifle Division. 
Training was complete 7 June 1940, and 1st Moscow Motor Rifle Division took part in Soviet occupation of the Baltic states since 15 June 1940, advancing from base in Polotsk and forward positions at Widze to Panevėžys 16 June 1940. After a month-long garrison duty in Panevėžys and 2-month long garrisoning of Daugavpils, the 1st Moscow Motor Rifle Division was returned to Russia. For the actions during Soviet occupation of the Baltic states, the 6th motorized rifle regiment was awarded Order of the Red Star 22 February 1941.

Eastern Front (World War II)

Before annihilation near Smolensk
On 22 June 1941 it was part of the 7th Mechanised Corps, alongside the 14th and 18th tank divisions in the Moscow Military District, assigned to the 20th Army. 
23 June 1941, the 1st Moscow Motor Rifle Division was replenished to the full strength of 10831 men. It was the first Soviet formation to use T-34 tanks, at Borisov, on June 30, 1941. 
Yartsevo in Sep 1941.
11 July 1941, after suffering heavy losses, the 1st Moscow Motor Rifle Division was moved to the reserve of 20th army and placed north of Orsha, and was completely encircled by the German forces 14 July 1941.
25 July 1941, the elements of 6th and 175th motor rifle regiments of 1st Moscow Motor Rifle Division break encirclement near Mogilev, but have suffered more losses in the heavy rearguard fighting by 30 July 1941. During that period, heavy personnel flow left few if any of the initial combatants.
By 5 August 1941, remnants of the 1st Moscow Motor Rifle Division were wiped out after being encircled again in Smolensk region, in unclear circumstances.

After annihilation near Smolensk
5 August 1941, the 1st Moscow Motor Rifle Division was re-formed anew within 20th army, 18 August 1941 renamed "1st armoured division" and on September 21, 1941, it was renamed the "1st Guards Moscow Motor Rifle Division". The division was renamed (again) as the "1st Guards Rifle Division", in January 1943. 
30 August 1941, the 1st armoured division was participating in the Yelnya Offensive, forcing back 28th Jäger Division. Due heavy losses, the division was stopped advancing 10 September 1941 and was withdrawn to behind of Vop River.
18 September 1941, the 1st armoured division was withdrawn to Mozhaysk for replenishment and subordinated directly to Stavka.
30 September 1941, the 1st Guards Moscow Motor Rifle Division was assigned to 40th army and sent to Sumy region. After initial advances, the 1st Guards Moscow Motor Rifle Division started to retreat 6 October 1941 as First Battle of Kharkov was being lost by Soviet forces. After losing Sumy 10 October 1941, the division was withdrawn to the reserve and sent back to Moscow. 
21 October 1941, the division was assigned to 3rd army and arrived to Naro-Fominsk. The 1st Guards Moscow Motor Rifle Division lost 70% of personnel in urban warfare before retreating from Naro-Fominsk 25 October 1941. Attempt to re-take Naro-Fominsk 28 October 1941 have failed. The division remained in Naro-Fominsk area until end of November 1941.
29 January 1942, the division liberated the village of Myatlevo in cooperation with the 415th Rifle Division during the winter counteroffensive in front of Moscow.
In 1942, the 1st Guards Moscow Motor Rifle Division was participating in Battle of Rzhev.
In July 1943, the 1st Guards Rifle Division was participating in Operation Kutuzov, in October 1943 - in Bryansk offensive, and in December 1943 - in Haradok offensive.
In January–July 1944, the 1st Guards Rifle Division was advancing in Vitebsk - Minsk direction with heavy fighting, and was awarded 'Minsk' honorific 13 July 1944.
In November 1944, the division invaded East Prussia in Gusev area, and finally stormed Königsberg in April 1945.
21-26 April 1945, the 1st Guards Rifle Division ended the war by storming Baltiysk as part of 11th Guards Army of the 3rd Belorussian Front.

Post war

The division was for all of the post-war period stationed in Kaliningrad. It formed part of the 11th Guards Army. It became the 1st Guards Moscow MRD (again) in 1957. Of the regiments of the war period, the 171st Guards was eliminated, but instead in March 1959 came the 12th Guards Motorised Rifle Regiment. Virtually all of the time the division was truncated (serving as a low-strength cadre formation).

For much of the 1990s the division was reduced to a strength of only 4,400 men, but in 2002 was reduced in size again to the 7th Separate Guards Motor Rifle Brigade, and, circa 2009-10, was reduced yet again, this time renamed as the 7th Independent "Proletarian Moscow-Minsk" Guards Motorized Rifle Regiment of the Baltic Fleet.

Notes

References
Poirier and Connor, The Red Army Order of Battle

External links
Baltic Military District (Russian), including units and equipment holdings for division in 1989-91

G001
Infantry divisions of Russia
Military units and formations established in 1926
Military units and formations disestablished in 2002